is a railway station in the city of Mutsu, Aomori, Japan, operated by East Japan Railway Company (JR East).

Lines
Ōminato Station is the northern terminus of the Ōminato Line, and lies 58.4 km from the southern terminus of the line at Noheji Station.

Station layout
The station has two opposed side platforms serving two terminating tracks. The station building has a Midori no Madoguchi staffed ticket office.

Platforms

History
Ōminato Station opened on September 25, 1921 as a station on the Japanese Government Railways (JGR). With the privatization of the Japanese National Railways (JNR, the successor to the JGR) on April 1, 1987, it came under the operational control of JR East.

Bus services
JR Bus Tohoku Company
For Wakinosawa via Kawaushi-Machi
For Tanabu

Passenger statistics
In fiscal 2018, the station was used by an average of 145 passengers daily (boarding passengers only).

Surrounding area
 
 Ōminato Port

See also
 List of railway stations in Japan

References

External links

JR East station information 

Railway stations in Aomori Prefecture
Ōminato Line
Railway stations in Japan opened in 1921
Mutsu, Aomori